The Intronerator is a database of alternatively spliced genes and a database of introns for Caenorhabditis elegans.

See also
 Alternative splicing
 AspicDB
 EDAS
 Hollywood (database)
 List of biological databases

References

External links

A working copy of the Intronerator no longer exists as of 2003.
Equivalent functions can be performed with the U.C. Santa Cruz
genome browser:
 http://genome.ucsc.edu/cgi-bin/hgTracks?clade=worm&organism=C._elegans

Biological databases
Gene expression
Spliceosome
RNA splicing